Zieliniec  is a village in the administrative district of Gmina Kołaczkowo, within Września County, Greater Poland Voivodeship, in west-central Poland.

The village has a population of 490.

References

Zieliniec